Karim Djellabi (born 31 May 1983) is a French former professional footballer who played as a midfielder. Having been formed as a left-winger, he played mainly as left-back.

Career
In summer 2015, Djellabi joined Clermont Foot on a two-year contract.

References

External links
 
 

1983 births
Living people
Sportspeople from Épinay-sur-Seine
French sportspeople of Algerian descent
Association football midfielders
Algerian footballers
French footballers
Angers SCO players
FC Nantes players
AJ Auxerre players
Clermont Foot players
Ligue 2 players
Footballers from Seine-Saint-Denis